The members of the 15th Manitoba Legislature were elected in the Manitoba general election held in August 1915. The legislature sat from January 6, 1916, to March 27, 1920.

The Liberal Party led by Tobias Norris formed the government.

Albert Prefontaine of the Conservatives was Leader of the Opposition.

On January 16, 1916, a bill was passed to amend the Manitoba Election Act to grant women the right to vote. Manitoba became the first Canadian province where women were allowed to vote and hold office.

In a referendum held on March 13, 1916, the province's voters supported prohibition. On June 1, the Manitoba Temperance Act came into effect, which banned the sale of liquor in the province, except by pharmacists for medical purposes. However, bringing alcohol into the province for personal use or for wholesale outside the province was still legal.

Also in 1916, the Workers Compensation Act was passed, which established the Workers Compensation Board of Manitoba. The act established an employer-funded compensation system for work-related injuries or illness and, in exchange, employers were granted protection against lawsuits by workers for these occurrences.

In 1918, a Minimum Wage Act was passed. Manitoba and British Columbia were the first provinces in Canada to introduce minimum wage legislation. In 1921, the minimum hourly wage in Manitoba was $0.25. Up until 1931, the minimum wage only applied to female workers.

James Bryson Baird served as speaker for the assembly.

There were five sessions of the 15th Legislature:

Douglas Colin Cameron was Lieutenant Governor of Manitoba until August 3, 1916, when James Albert Manning Aikins became lieutenant governor.

Members of the Assembly 
The following members were elected to the assembly in 1915:

Notes:

By-elections 
By-elections were held to replace members for various reasons:

References 

Terms of the Manitoba Legislature
1916 establishments in Manitoba
1920 disestablishments in Manitoba